Dairsie railway station served the village of Dairsie, Fife, Scotland from 1848 to 1954 on the Edinburgh and Northern Railway.

History 
The station opened on 17 May 1848 by the Edinburgh and Northern Railway. To the south was Dairsie Castle and to the north was a loading bank. A signal box was north of the southbound platform. This closed in 1965, 11 years after the station which closed on 20 September 1954.

References

External links 

Disused railway stations in Fife
Former North British Railway stations
Railway stations in Great Britain opened in 1848
Railway stations in Great Britain closed in 1954
1848 establishments in Scotland
1954 disestablishments in Scotland